Kayrat Kulbayev (Qaırat Kýlybaev) is a Kazakh music producer who rose to popularity as a jury member in SuperStar KZ 3, the Kazakh version of Pop Idol. Kayrat served as the vice president of Kazakh media firm Shahar Media Group, official partner & associate of SonyBMG in Kazakhstan, from 2003 till 2006.

Biography 

Kayrat used to be producer of pop music duo "Duet L" in early 1990s. He is now a producer of pop-bands "Chinatown", "Pertsy".

He is married and has two daughters.

References 

SuperStar KZ
Kazakhstani musicians
Living people
Year of birth missing (living people)